Jim Read may refer to:

 Jim Read (alpine skier) (born 1962), Canadian former alpine skier
 Jim Read (footballer) (1943–2020), Australian rules footballer

See also 
 Jim Reid (disambiguation)
 Jim Reed (disambiguation)